Edward Lawson "Barto" Bartlett (March 10, 1906 – December 21, 1976) was a West Indian cricketer who played in West Indies'  inaugural Test tour of England in 1928.  

He was born in Flint Hall, St. Michael, Barbados, and played first-class cricket as a batsman for Barbados from 1923–24 to 1938–39. His only first-class century was 109 against Nottinghamshire in 1928. His best Test score was 84 (in 119 minutes) against Australia in the First Test in 1930–31.  

He died in St. Michael, Barbados, at the age of seventy. Wisden had erroneously reported his death in its 1934 edition. In his obituary in the 1978 edition, Wisden said of him that "he had strokes all round the wicket and, when he was making runs, his potentialities were obvious. It was sad that he could so seldom do justice to them." In his history of Barbados cricket, Bruce Hamilton said Bartlett was the "perfect stylist, fully equipped for batsmanship in the grand manner, with every quality except temperament".

In June 1988, 101 Barbadian 50c stamps were issued featuring the Barbados Cricket Buckle with a photograph of "Barto" Bartlett instead of Herman Griffith. These errors were issued through Parcel Post Office in Bridgetown. All other postal counters had their stocks recovered before 9am on Monday 6 June 1988 and the corrected 50c stamps depicting Griffith were issued on 11 July 1988. The 101 stamps that were issued featuring Bartlett are highly collectable.

References

External links

Barto Bartlett at Cricket Archive

1906 births
1976 deaths
West Indies Test cricketers
Barbadian cricketers
Barbados cricketers
People from Saint Michael, Barbados